Abbye "Pudgy" Stockton (August 11, 1917  – June 26, 2006) was a professional strongwoman and forerunner of present-day female bodybuilders, who became famous through her involvement with Muscle Beach in the 1940s.

Abbye Eville was born on August 11, 1917, and moved to Santa Monica, California, in 1924.  She acquired the nickname "Pudgy" as a child, and the name stuck, even though she weighed approximately 115 pounds at a height of 5'2".  She began dating UCLA student Les Stockton during her senior year of high school; they were married in 1941.

Career
Stockton and her husband were frequent visitors to Muscle Beach, where they primarily worked on acrobatics and gymnastics. One of their most famous feats involved Pudgy serving as the "understander", supporting Les (180 pounds) over her head in a hand to hand stand.  Pudgy quickly became a media favorite, and was included in pictorials in Life, Pic, and Laff.  She was also featured in the newsreels Whatta Build and Muscle Town USA, as well as ads for Ritamine Vitamin Company and the Universal Camera Company.  She estimated that she was featured on the cover of forty-two magazines by the end of the 1940s (Todd, 1999).  She posed with many of the top male bodybuilders of the time, including John Grimek and Steve Reeves (Black, 2004).

In 1944, Stockton began writing a regular column on women's training, "Barbelles", in Strength & Health magazine, then the most influential fitness magazine in the world.

She helped organize the first Amateur Athletic Union-sanctioned weightlifting competition for women, which was held in 1947. In that contest, Stockton pressed 100 pounds, snatched 105 pounds, and clean and jerked 135 pounds.

Physique contests for women were virtually non-existent in the 1940s, and Stockton held only one such title during her career – she was named "Miss Physical Culture Venus" in 1948.  She was inducted into the IFBB Hall of Fame in 2000.

Pudgy and husband Les had a daughter.  Les died on April 19, 2004, at the age 87 from melanoma (Roark, 2004).  Abbye died on June 26, 2006, at the age of 88 from complications due to Alzheimer's disease.

References

Black, Jane, "Abbye 'Pudgy' Stockton", Milo, June, 2004
Roark, Joe, "Les Stockton Remembered", Flex, August, 2004
Thomas, Al, "Out of the Past...A Fond Remembrance: Abbye 'Pudgy' Stockton", Body & Power, March, 1981
Todd, Jan, "Pudgy Stockton", St. James Encyclopedia of Pop Culture, Gale Group, 1999
Todd, Jan, "The Legacy of Pudgy Stockton", Iron Game History, January, 1992

External links
IFBB Hall of Fame profile
Portrait (archived)

1917 births
2006 deaths
American female bodybuilders
Deaths from dementia in California
Deaths from Alzheimer's disease
People associated with physical culture
Strength training writers
Strongwomen
20th-century American women
20th-century American people
21st-century American women